The sands of time is an English idiom relating the passage of time to the sand in an hourglass.

The hourglass is an antiquated timing instrument consisting of two glass chambers connected vertically by a narrow passage which allows sand to trickle from the upper part to the lower by means of gravity. The amount of sand determines the amount of time that passes as the chamber is emptied. The image of the sand being emptied in the hourglass creates a visual metaphor for the limited duration of human life, and for the inevitability of change in the world as a whole.

Uses
The phrase was used in the seventh stanza of the poem A Psalm of Life by Henry Wadsworth Longfellow. 

Lives of great men all remind us 
We can make our lives sublime, 
And, departing, leave behind us 
Footprints on the sands of time

See also
 Hourglass § Symbolic uses
 Vanitas

References
 Free Dictionary - Sands of Time
 "Brewer's Dictionary of Phrase and Fable" revised by Adrian Room (HarperCollinsPublishers, New York, 1999, Sixteenth Edition)

Further reading

 Apartmenttherapy.com - The Hourglass's Uncertain History

English phrases
English-language idioms